|}

The Boadicea Fillies' Stakes is a Listed flat horse race in Great Britain open to mares and fillies aged three years or over.
It is run at Newmarket over a distance of 6 furlongs (1,206 metres), and it is scheduled to take place each year in October.

The race was run for the first time in 1999.

Winners

See also
 Horse racing in Great Britain
 List of British flat horse races

References 
Racing Post: 

Flat races in Great Britain
Newmarket Racecourse
Sprint category horse races for fillies and mares